Ethel Muriel Ashton  (11 November 190321 October 1999),  known professionally as Queenie Ashton, was a character actress, born in England, who had a long career in Australia as a theatre performer and radio personality, best known for her radio and television soap opera roles, although she did also feature briefly in films. 

Ashton alongside her contemporaries Grace Gibson, Amber Mae Cecil and Ethel Lang, has been described as a pioneer for females in radio.  Her best known role's was in the long-running Gwen Meredith radio serial Blue Hills, as Lee Gordonand later Grannie Emily Bishop a role she would later reprise for television, with the first Australian-produced soap opera Autumn Affair.

Biography

Early life and stage
Ashton was born in London. She was an accomplished ballet dancer, and specialist in voice production and drama, who started performing when she was fourteen. She appeared in musical comedy on the London stage, on occasion appearing with playwright Noël Coward. She left England in 1927, and performed for Dame Nellie Melba while travelling to Australia through the Suez Canal. She first appeared in Melbourne as a soprano on the concert stage, then in musical comedy, alongside such stars as Gladys Moncrieff, whom she understudied, and Strella Wilson.

Radio
Ashton featured in radio from the 1930s, she appeared in musical comedy opposite Dick Bentley in Oh! Quaite.  Her first straight drama role was in 1939, a period piece playing Marie Antoinette.
She played Budge's mother in "Budge's Gang", a segment of the ABC Children's Session (c. 1941–45, and it was so popular it was made into a comic book). Most notably, she played the wife of Dr. Gordon and the long-running role of Granny Bishop (a character many years her senior) in the radio serial Blue Hills, for the entire 27 years of the serial's run (1949–1976 – hers were the very first and last spoken parts). Ashton, as Granny Bishop, spoke: "We don't have to see people every day of the week/to imagine them in their surroundings or even to live their lives with them. We can still use our imagination ... they can still be in our minds. They can still be with us and so you see, and it is isn't really very hard to say goodbye. to say goodbye and God bless."

Television and film
Ashton also played this role on Australia's first television serial Autumn Affair. In 1957 she appeared in a one-off television play called Tomorrow's Child and played in Certain Women (as "Dolly Lucas"), She was a semi-regular cast member of A Country Practice (as "Lillian Coote") and G.P. (as "Mrs Sculthorpe").  
 
Film roles included both theatrical and telefilms Always Another Dawn in 1948  and The Farrer Story in 1949, she  also had cameo's in Mama's Gone A-Hunting in 1977 and The Year My Voice Broke in 1987. She also appeared in many television commercials, most notably for Sara Lee. She was still performing in stage and cabaret plays in her nineties and was one of Australia's last great grand dames and one of the oldest entertainers still performing.

Personal life
Ashton married Lionel Lawson in 1931 (who died in 1950), a violinist, who became leader of the Sydney Symphony Orchestra; they had a daughter, nurse Janet Lawson, in 1933 and a son, Tony Lawson, in 1935. They divorced in 1940. 

Ashton remarried in 1946 to Frederick John Cover, a theatrical agent, and founder and managing director of the actors' casting firm, Central Casting. 

She died on 21 October 1999, in Carlingford, New South Wales, aged 95.

Selected stage appearances

Filmography

FILM

TELEVISION

Radio

Recognition
In 1950 she won the Macquarie Network's award for "best performance by an actress in a supporting role" (in "Edward, My Son").

In 1980, she was appointed by her stage name Queenie Ashton a Member of the Order of Australia (AM) for her services to the performing arts.

Notes

References

Citations

Sources

External links
 Read more about Queenie Ashton, and listen to an oral history interview done with her on the National Film and Sound Archive of Australia's website.
 Visit the National Film and Sound Archive's Women in Early Radio collection for more information about the history of women in radio in Australia.
 

1903 births
1999 deaths
Australian radio actresses
Australian stage actresses
Australian television actresses
Australian film actresses
20th-century Australian actresses
British sopranos
English emigrants to Australia
20th-century Australian women singers
20th-century English women singers
20th-century English singers
Members of the Order of Australia